Pietro Paolo Sensini (1555 – 1632) was an Italian painter active in a Mannerist-style painting religious altarpieces mainly in his native city of Todi and nearby towns in Umbria.

Biography
He was born in Todi to a prominent family. He worked alongside Ferraù Fenzoni, Bartolomeo Barbiani, and Andrea Polinari. He was a member of the communal council in 1619.

References

1555 births
1632 deaths
16th-century Italian painters
17th-century Italian painters
Italian male painters
Umbrian painters
Italian Mannerist painters